GRK Varaždin is a Croatian handball team from Varaždin. Their home matches are played at the Športska dvorana Varaždin. They compete in Dukat Premijer liga.

European record

Team

Current squad 

Squad for the 2016–17 season

Goalkeepers
 Domagoj Crnila
 Sandro Mestric 
 Matija Spikic 

Wingers
RW
  Bruno Dozet 
  Petar Grbac
  Ante Tokic
LW 
  Tomislav Hirs
  Ivan Laljek
  Jakov Turk
Line players 
  Ivan Obrljan
  Marin Sipic

Back players
LB
  Patrik Ipsa 
  Dominik Novak
  Andrej Obranovic
  Luka Trojko
  Sebastijan Vincek
  Frano Vujovic
CB 
  Vedran Hud
  Ivan Koprek 
  Bruno Levak 
  Jurica Vidacek 
  Luka Zrinski 
RB
  Manuel Hutinec
  Bruno-Vili Zobec

External links
 EHF Club profile

Handball in Croatia
Croatian handball clubs
Sport in Varaždin